Philia (minor planet designation: 280 Philia) is a fairly large Main belt asteroid. It was discovered by Johann Palisa on 29 October 1888 at the Vienna Observatory.

Sparse data collected during a 1987 study indicated this asteroid has a rotation period of approximately 64 hours, which is much longer than can be continually observed from one site. During 2010−2011, an international collaboration to study the asteroid collected 9,037 photometric data points over 38 sessions.

References

External links
 
 

Background asteroids
Philia
Philia
18881029